The Fiji men's national under-18 basketball team is the men's basketball side that represents Fiji in international under-18 basketball competitions, including the FIBA Oceania Under-18 Championship.

Competition results

World Championships
yet to qualify

Oceanian Championships

See also
 Fiji national basketball team
 Fiji women's national basketball team

References

External links
Fiji Basketball Records at FIBA Archive

Fiji national basketball team
Men's national under-18 basketball teams